Edward "Eddie" Anthony Sundquist (born December 31, 1988) is an American attorney and politician from the state of New York. A Democrat, he is the 25th and current Mayor of the City of Jamestown, New York, serving since January 1, 2020.

Sundquist was a 2018 candidate for the United States House of Representatives in New York's 23rd congressional district. He was defeated by Democrat Tracy Mitrano in the party's primary on June 26, 2018. On November 6, 2019, he was elected mayor of Jamestown, New York with 49.8% of the vote, defeating Republican Dave Wilfong and Libertarian Andrew Liuzzo.

References

1988 births
Living people
People from Chautauqua County, New York
Politicians from Jamestown, New York
New York (state) Democrats